Arabella Katherine Hankey (12 January 1834 – 9 May 1911) was an English missionary and nurse who is best known for being the author of the poem The Old, Old Story, from which the hymns "Tell me the old, old story" and "I Love to Tell the Story" were derived.

Biography
Hankey was born in 1834, the daughter of a prosperous banker in London. Her family were devout Anglicans and members of the Clapham Sect. She was inspired by the Methodist revival of John Wesley and organised and taught in Sunday schools in London. She then did missionary work as a nurse in South Africa, assisting her brother.

In 1866, she had a serious illness and was bedridden for a long convalescence.  During this time, Hankey wrote her long poem, titled Tell me the Old, Old Story of unseen things above, with 50 verses in two parts: The Story Wanted and The Story Told. Hankey's masterpiece was put to music by the American composer William Howard Doane.

She recovered from the illness and lived to the age of 77, dying in 1911.

See also
English women hymnwriters (18th to 19th-century)

 Eliza Sibbald Alderson
 Augusta Amherst Austen
 Sarah Bache
 Charlotte Alington Barnard
 Sarah Doudney
 Charlotte Elliott
 Ada R. Habershon
 Frances Ridley Havergal
 Maria Grace Saffery
 Anne Steele
 Emily Taylor
 Emily H. Woodmansee

References

External links
 

1834 births
1911 deaths
English Anglican missionaries
Evangelical Anglicans
Church of England hymnwriters
Christianity in London
English women poets
19th-century English poets
19th-century English women writers
19th-century English musicians
Anglican missionaries in South Africa
Anglican poets
British women hymnwriters
19th-century British women musicians
British expatriates in South Africa